Jacksonburg or Jacksonburgh is a hamlet located on NY 5S, southwest of the city of Little Falls in Herkimer County, New York, United States. Erie Canal Lock 18 is located in Jacksonburg.

References

Hamlets in Herkimer County, New York
Hamlets in New York (state)